Liga Indonesia First Division (Indonesian: Divisi Satu Liga Indonesia) was the third level football competition in Indonesian football league system (often called as Liga Indonesia). This competition is managed by the Football Association of Indonesia (PSSI).

Prior to 2008, the formation of Indonesia Super League, First Division was on the second tier.

After the establishment of the Liga Nusantara in 2014, in 2015 the First Division was dissolved.

Championship history

1995–2008 (second-tier)

2008–2014 (third-tier)

Awarded

Top scorer

Broadcaster
TVRI (Semifinal & Final only) : 2009-2010,2010,2011-2012
MNCTV (Final only) : 2013

References

 
3
Sports leagues established in 1995
Sports leagues disestablished in 2015